Mount Langford el.  is a mountain peak in the Absaroka Range in Yellowstone National Park.  The peak is named for Nathaniel P. Langford, the first superintendent of Yellowstone and a leader of the Washburn–Langford–Doane Expedition to Yellowstone in 1870.  The expedition and Langford's subsequent promotion in Scribner's helped in the creation of the park in 1872.

On September 7, 1870 the Washburn expedition was camped along the southwestern shore of Yellowstone Lake.  That day Langford and Lt. Gustavus Cheyney Doane chose to ascend a nearby peak.  From that peak, Langford sketched the first reasonably accurate map of Yellowstone Lake.  Upon their return to camp, Henry D. Washburn named the peak they ascended and a nearby secondary peak: Mount Langford and Mount Doane.  They are annotated on the map Langford sketched.  Langford described the summit with these words:

During the Hayden Geological Survey of 1871, Hayden, for unknown reasons, moved the names of Mount Langford and Doane to peaks farther north.  The original Mount Langford remained unnamed until 1885 when Arnold Hague named it Colter Peak.

See also
 Mountains and mountain ranges of Yellowstone National Park

Notes

Mountains of Wyoming
Mountains of Yellowstone National Park
Mountains of Park County, Wyoming